Barauli Ahir is a village in Agra district of Uttar Pradesh in India.

Barauli Ahir is a village in Fatehpur Sikri Vidhan Sabha dominated by Yadav community. As per tale this village was Barauli Brahman 300 years earlier, during dusk of Mughal Empire, Brahmins and other caste communities used to live in this village, but Yadavas and some  other lower castes were kept separate outside the village due caste system discrimination and harassment, after winning the competition organized by the king of that time, they were rewarded with an army contingent. After Getting this, village got justice by cutting the rope of discrimination and got a place on the basis of majority population in the village and removed the unfair.The village has very less crime rate as compared to the state, people live with harmony here. Barauli Ahir was named one of the cleanest village's in the State. Barauli Ahir village has a higher literacy rate compared to Uttar Pradesh. In 2011, the literacy rate of Barauli Ahir village was 78.82% compared to 67.68% of Uttar Pradesh. In Barauli Ahir Male literacy stands at 88.85% while the female literacy rate was 67.60%.

As per the constitution of India and the Panchyati Raaj Act, Barauli Ahir village is administrated by Sarpanch (Head of Village) who is elected representative of the village.
This village become hub of cbse schools and luxurious residential colony due to advantage of spreading of Agra city in its surrounding locations. Village also has Block level CHC Hospital, G.R.Hospital and various Higher Secondary Schools and Convent Schools, Degree Colleges, Mandi Samiti etc. Now a development hub and an Emerging area of the city.

References

Villages in Agra district